Paliperidone, sold under the trade name Invega among others, is an atypical antipsychotic. It is mainly used to treat schizophrenia and schizoaffective disorder. 
  
It is marketed by Janssen Pharmaceuticals. An extended release formulation is available that uses the OROS extended release system to allow for once-daily dosing. Paliperidone palmitate is a long-acting injectable formulation of paliperidone palmitoyl ester.

It is on the World Health Organization's List of Essential Medicines.

Medical use
It is used for the treatment of schizophrenia and schizoaffective disorder.

Adverse effects
Sources:

Very Common (>10% incidence)
 Headache
 Tachycardia
 Somnolence (causes less sedation than most atypical antipsychotics)
 Insomnia
 Hyperprolactinaemia (seems to cause comparable prolactin elevation to its parent drug, risperidone)
 Sexual Dysfunction

Common (1–10% incidence)
 Cough
 Extrapyramidal side effects (EPSE; e.g. dystonia, akathisia, muscle rigidity, parkinsonism. It appears to produce similar EPSE to risperidone, asenapine and ziprasidone and more EPSE than olanzapine, clozapine, aripiprazole, quetiapine, amisulpride and sertindole)
 Orthostatic hypotension
 Weight gain (tends to produce a moderate degree of weight gain, possibly related to its potent blockade of the 5-HT2C receptor)
 QT interval prolongation (tends to produce less QT interval prolongation than most other atypical antipsychotics and approximately as much QT interval prolongation as aripiprazole and lurasidone)
 Nasopharyngitis
 Anxiety
 Indigestion
 Constipation

Discontinuation
The British National Formulary recommends a gradual withdrawal when discontinuing antipsychotics to avoid acute withdrawal syndrome or rapid relapse. Symptoms of withdrawal commonly include nausea, vomiting, and loss of appetite. Other symptoms may include restlessness, increased sweating, and trouble sleeping. Less commonly there may be a feeling of the world spinning, numbness, or muscle pains. Symptoms generally resolve after a short period of time.

There is tentative evidence that discontinuation of antipsychotics can result in psychosis. It may also result in reoccurrence of the condition that is being treated. Rarely tardive dyskinesia can occur when the medication is stopped.

Deaths
In April 2014, it was reported that 21 Japanese people who had received shots of the long-acting injectable paliperidone to date had died, out of 10,700 individuals prescribed the drug.

Pharmacology

Paliperidone is the primary active metabolite of the older antipsychotic risperidone.  While its specific mechanism of action is unknown, it is believed paliperidone and risperidone act via similar, if not identical, pathways. Its efficacy is believed to result from central dopaminergic and serotonergic antagonism. Food is known to increase the absorption of Invega type ER OROS prolonged-release tablets. Food increased exposure of paliperidone by up to 50-60%, however, half-life was not significantly affected. The effect was probably due to a delay in the transit of the ER OROS formulation in the upper part of the GI channel, resulting in increased absorption.

The half-life is 23 hours.

Risperidone and its metabolite paliperidone are reduced in efficacy by P-glycoprotein inducers such as St John's wort

History
Paliperidone (as Invega) was approved by the Food and Drug Administration (FDA) for the treatment of schizophrenia in 2006.  Paliperidone was approved by the FDA for the treatment of schizoaffective disorder in 2009. The long-acting injectable form of paliperidone, marketed as Invega Sustenna in U.S. and Xeplion in Europe, was approved by the FDA on July 31, 2009. It is the only available brand in Bangladesh under the brand name "Palimax ER" manufactured & marketed by ACI Pharmaceuticals. 

It was initially approved in Europe in 2007 for schizophrenia, the extended release form and use for schizoaffective disorder were approved in Europe in 2010, and extension to use in adolescents older than 15 years old was approved in 2014.

Brand names
On May 18, 2015, a new formulation of paliperidone palmitate was approved by the FDA under the brand name Invega Trinza. A similar 3 -monthly injection of prolonged release suspension was approved in 2016 by the European Medicines Agency originally under the brand name Paliperidone Janssen, later renamed to Trevicta. On September 1, 2021, a newer formulation of paliperidone palmitate, Invega Hafyera, was approved by the US FDA which is available as an injection every six months.

References

External links 
 
 
 

Alpha-2 blockers
Atypical antipsychotics
Belgian inventions
Benzisoxazoles
Human drug metabolites
Johnson & Johnson brands
Lactams
Mood stabilizers
Fluoroarenes
Piperidines
Prolactin releasers
World Health Organization essential medicines